Mokla (also called Mokhla) is a village located in Jaisalmer district of the Indian state of Rajasthan.

Demographics

According to the 2011 Census of India, Mokla village has a total population of 997. The number of households in the village is 188. The female population is 46.9%.

References

Villages in Jaisalmer district